Old Xian (Old先) is an artist based in Hangzhou, China. She presents herself as a male character in her comics. She graduated from the Central Academy of Fine Arts (CAFA) in 2013. In 2012, she released The Specific Heat Capacity of Love as well as Xiao Chou Dan Ni (aka Joker Danny). Xiao Chou Dan Ni earned Xian a Shueisha Tezuka Award and a Golden Dragon Award. She has also worked on «Mosspaca Advertising Department», in collaboration with her coworker Tan Jiu, who produced Tamen De Gushi. She is well known for her manhua 19 Days.

References

Living people
Central Academy of Fine Arts alumni
Year of birth missing (living people)